Karmaskaly (Qırmıśqalı) is a rural locality (a selo) and the administrative center of Karmaskalinsky District in the Republic of Bashkortostan, Russia. As of the 2010 Census, its population was 8,540.

References

Notes

Sources

Rural localities in Karmaskalinsky District